In Caribbean folklore, the Lusca is a name given to a sea monster said to exist in the region of the blue holes nearby Andros, an island in the Bahamas.

Description
It is described as a giant octopus, a giant cuttlefish, or a half shark, half octopus.

In popular culture
The reports of a lusca monster attacking swimmers and divers was investigated by Jeremy Wade, the host of the television series River Monsters, in the episode "Terror in Paradise" (season eight, episode four). After investigating reef sharks, tiger sharks, and the giant Pacific octopus, Wade settles on a large octopus being the most likely culprit for being the lusca monster.

A Caribbean Film Festival, Lusca Fantastic Film Fest, was named after this sea monster; the festival is an annual event held in Puerto Rico. It is the first and only international fantastic film festival in the Caribbean.

The survival video game Stranded Deep features an enemy giant squid named Lusca the Great.

In the HGTV series Renovation Island—which revolves around Bryan and Sarah Baeumler's efforts to renovate a resort in South Andros—the main restaurant at the resort is named Lusca in honor of the sea creature.

See also
 Kraken

References 

Caribbean legendary creatures
Mythological cephalopods
Sea monsters